"Wide Open Road" is a song written and originally recorded by Johnny Cash. Recorded by him for Sun in March 1955, it wasn't released as a single until 1964, years after Cash's move to Columbia.

References 

1964 songs
1964 singles
Sun Records singles
Songs written by Johnny Cash
Johnny Cash songs